Jawdat Al-Qazwini (Arabic:جودت القزويني) (24 March 1953 – 7 April 2020) was an Iraqi scholar.

Biography
He was born in Baghdad and studied in the academic and traditional fields in Najaf and Karbala. He travelled around different Iraqi cities, seeking biographies of great scholars from different sects. This work also led him to travel to other countries, including Egypt, Syria, Iran and India.

He died of natural death at the age of 67 in London on 7 April 2020.

Education
Al-Qazwini studied for his bachelor's degree in Islamic sciences from Baghdad University, a master's degree in Islamic studies at Cairo University and his doctorate at SOAS University, London.

Publications
أحلام شجرة الزيتون : قصص قصيرة / Aḥlām shajarat al-zaytūn : qiṣaṣ qaṣīrah. Beirut: al-Khazāʼin li-Iḥyāʼ al-Turāth, 2016 
الحمزة الغربي عليه السلام : حفيد العباس بن علي بن ابي طالب / al-Ḥamzah al-Gharbī ʻalayhi al-salām : ḥafīd al-ʻAbbās ibn ʻAlī ibn Abī Ṭālib. al-Khazāʼin li-Iḥyāʼ al-Turāth, 2014. 
تاريخ عزاء طويرج / Tārīkh ʻazāʼ Ṭuwayrij. Beirut: al-Khazāʼin li-Iḥyāʼ al-Turāth, 2014. 

 قلائد الخرائد في أصول العقائد : رسالة في بيان عقائد الشيعة الإمامية الإثني عشرية / Qalāʼid al-kharāʼid fī uṣūl al-ʻaqāʼid : risālah fī bayān ʻaqāʼid al-Shīʻah al-Imāmīyah al-Ithnay ʻasharīyah. Beirut: Dār al-Rāfidayn, 2006. 
عز الدين الجزائري : رائد الحركة الاسلامية في العراق / ʻIzz al-Dīn al-Jazāʼirī : rāʼid al-ḥarakah al-Islāmīyah fī al-ʻIrāq. Beirut: Dār al-Rāfidayn, 2005.
Tārīkh al-muʼassasah al-dīnīyah al-Shīʻīyah : min al-ʻaṣr al-Buwayhī ilá nihāyat al-ʻaṣr al-Ṣafawī al-awwal (300-1000H/912-1591 M). Beirut : Dār al-Rāfidīn, 2005. 
المرجعية الدينية العليا عند الشيعة الامامية : دراسة في التطور السياسي والعلمي /al-Marjiʻīyah al-dīnīyah al-ʻulyā ʻinda al-Shīʻah al-Imāmīyah : dirāsah fī al-taṭawwur al-siyāsī wa-al-ʻilmī. Beirut: Dār al-Rāfidayn, 2005. 
تاريخ القزويني في تراجم المنسيين و المعروفين من أعلام العراق و غيرهم، 1900-2000 م. / Tārīkh al-Qazwīnī fī tarājim al-mansīyīn wa-al-maʻrūfīn min aʻlām al-ʻIrāq wa-ghayrihim, 1900-2000 M. Beirut: al-Khazāʼin li-Iḥyāʼ al-Turāth, 2012. 
العراق :‏ ‏صور من الماضي /al-ʻIrāq : ṣuwar min al-māḍī. London: Dār al-Warrāq lil-Nashr, 2003. 
al-Jānib al-akhlāqī fī fikr al-Imām al-Khumaynī. London : al-Markaz al-Islāmī, 2002. 
al-Majmūʻah al-shiʻrīyah al-ūlá, 1998.
Ashʻār muqātilah. Beirut: Muʼassasat al-Jihād, 1986. 
 قصائد الزمن القديم / Qaṣāʼid al-zamān al-qadīm Cairo:Dār Sarḥān lil-Ṭibāʻah, 1980.

References

مجلة المهجر
ملف مجلة المهجر
معلومات عامة عنه
A selfbiography for Dr. J Al-Qazwini published in the Journal of the season, see: mawsim Magazine Issue Year 1411 – No. 9,10 

1953 births
2020 deaths
Alumni of SOAS University of London
Iraqi scholars
21st-century Iraqi poets